Anderson High School is a public high school located in Anderson, Indiana. The school's students are known as "The Anderson Indians." Both the school and the city of Anderson, Indiana are named after Chief William Anderson, the leader of the  Unalatchgo Lenape people from 1806 to 1831.

Racism controversy
The school has been accused of racism and cultural appropriation for its portrayals of the school's mascots, "The Indian" and "The Maiden" during sports events, but defenders of the portrayals point to the history of the school's name and traditions.

Athletics 
Anderson currently competes in and was a founding member of the North Central Conference. From 1961 until 2011 the basketball teams played in Anderson's historic Wigwam which had a seating capacity of 8,996.

Notable alumni
 Melvin E. Biddle, United States Army Medal of Honor recipient
 Joe Campbell, professional golfer
 Harvey Weir Cook, American fighter ace in World War I
 Carl Erskine professional baseball player
 Jumping Johnny Wilson, former Harlem Globetrotter
 Ken Johnson, former NFL player
 Terry Johnson, American basketball coach
 Robert Kessler, former NBL player
 Troy Lewis, basketball player for Purdue University
 Josh Pitcock, chief of staff to the Vice President of the United States
 Amber Portwood, reality TV personality and criminal

See also
 List of high schools in Indiana

References

External links
Official Website

Schools in Madison County, Indiana
Public high schools in Indiana
1873 establishments in Indiana